2420 Čiurlionis, provisionally designated , is a stony Eunomian asteroid from the central regions of the asteroid belt, approximately 9 kilometers in diameter. It was discovered on 3 October 1975, by Soviet astronomer Nikolai Chernykh at the Crimean Astrophysical Observatory in Nauchnij, on the Crimean peninsula, and later named after Lithuanian painter and composer Mikalojus Čiurlionis.

Orbit and classification 

Čiurlionis is a member of the Eunomia family, a large group of S-type asteroids and the most prominent family in the intermediate main-belt. It orbits the Sun at a distance of 2.2–2.9 AU once every 4 years and 1 month (1,496 days). Its orbit has an eccentricity of 0.13 and an inclination of 15° with respect to the ecliptic.

Physical characteristics

Lightcurves 
Two rotational lightcurves of Čiurlionis were obtained from photometric observations. Lightcurve analysis gave a rotation period of 12.84 and 15.760 hours with a brightness amplitude of 0.48 and 0.51 magnitude, respectively.

Diameter and albedo 

According to the survey carried out by the NEOWISE mission of NASA's Wide-field Infrared Survey Explorer, Čiurlionis measures 8.444 kilometers in diameter and its surface has an albedo of 0.327. The Collaborative Asteroid Lightcurve Link assumes an albedo of 0.21 – derived from 15 Eunomia, the family's largest member and namesake – and calculates a diameter of 10.06 kilometers based on an absolute magnitude of 12.3.

Naming 

This minor planet was named after Lithuanian Art Nouveau painter and composer Mikalojus Konstantinas Čiurlionis (1875–1911). The approved naming citation was published by the Minor Planet Center on 17 February 1984.

References

External links 
 Asteroid Lightcurve Database (LCDB), query form (info )
 Dictionary of Minor Planet Names, Google books
 Asteroids and comets rotation curves, CdR – Observatoire de Genève, Raoul Behrend
 Discovery Circumstances: Numbered Minor Planets (1)-(5000) – Minor Planet Center
 

002420
Discoveries by Nikolai Chernykh
Named minor planets
19751003